Hwangju Airport(황주비행장) is an airport near Hwangju, Hwanghae-bukto, North Korea.

Facilities 
The airfield has a single concrete runway 12/30 measuring 8180 x 154 feet (2493 x 47 m).  It is sited in a valley and has several supporting taxiways and three aprons which adjoin the runway.  It is home to a fighter regiment of 44 MiG-19 jets.

References 

Airports in North Korea
North Hwanghae